Judit Bárdos, married Pecháček (born 12 May 1988) is a Slovak actress of Hungarian ethnicity. She is the daughter of politician Gyula Bárdos and journalist Ágnes Bárdos. Bárdos won the Best Actress Award at the 2012 The Sun in a Net Awards for her performance in the 2011 film The House. In 2018, she won Best Supporting Actress Award at The Sun in a Net Awards for her role in Out.

Selected filmography 
The House (2011)
Fair Play (2014)
In Silence (2014)
Svět pod hlavou (television, 2017)
Out (2017)
Sunset (2018)
The Grandson (2022)
The Last Race (2022)

References

External links

1988 births
Living people
Hungarians in Slovakia
Slovak film actresses
Slovak television actresses
Slovak stage actresses
Actors from Bratislava
21st-century Slovak actresses
Sun in a Net Awards winners